Allen Independent School District is a public school district based in Allen, Texas (USA). Allen ISD covers most of the city of Allen, as well as portions of the cities of McKinney, Plano, and Parker. The district has a total enrollment of 21,634 students, with an expected growth rate of 1–2% per year.

Finances
As of the 2016–2017 school year, the appraised valuation of property in the district was $10,146,542,000. The maintenance tax rate was $1.14 and the bond tax rate was $0.45 per $100 of appraised valuation.

Academic achievement
In 2011, the school district was rated "recognized" by the Texas Education Agency.  Thirty-five percent of districts in Texas in 2011 received the same rating. No state accountability ratings will be given to districts in 2012. A school district in Texas can receive one of four possible rankings from the Texas Education Agency: Exemplary (the highest possible ranking), Recognized, Academically Acceptable, and Academically Unacceptable (the lowest possible ranking).

In 2013, the Texas Education Agency changed the rating system. A district can now get one out of four possible rankings: Met Standard, Met Alternative Standard, Improvement Required, and Not Rated.

Historical district TEA accountability ratings

2018: Not Released
2017: Met Standard
2016: Met Standard
2015: Met Standard
2014: Met Standard
2013: Met Standard
2012: N/A
2011: Recognized
2010: Exemplary
2009: Recognized
2008: Recognized
2007: Academically Acceptable
2006: Recognized
2005: Academically Acceptable
2004: Academically Acceptable

Demographics

Schools
In the 2019–2020 school year, the district had students in twenty-three schools.

High schools (10–12) 
 Allen High School
 Allen ISD S.T.E.A.M Center

Freshman center (9) 
Lowery Freshman Center

Middle schools (7–8) 
 Walter & Lois Curtis Middle School
 Ereckson Middle School
 Ford Middle School

Elementary schools (EE, K–6) 
 George J. Anderson Elementary
 Luther and Anna Mae Bolin Elementary
 Dr. E.T. Boon Elementary
 Alton Boyd Elementary
 Carlena Chandler Elementary
 Beverly Cheatham Elementary
 Mary Evans Elementary
 Flossie Floyd Green Elementary
 Jenny Preston Elementary
 James D. Kerr Elementary
 Lois Lindsey Elementary
 James & Margie Marion Elementary
 Frances E. Norton Elementary
 David E. & Lynda F. Olson Elementary
 Gene M. Reed Elementary
 D.L. Rountree Elementary
 Alvis C. Story Elementary
 Max O. Vaughan Elementary

Disciplinary schools 
 Collin County JJAEP (grades 6–12)
 Pat Dillard Special Achievement Center (grades K–12)

Special programs

Athletics
Allen High School participates in the boys sports of baseball, basketball, football, lacrosse, soccer, swimming, and wrestling, track, golf, tennis, and cross country. The school participates in the girls sports of basketball, lacrosse, soccer, softball, swimming, and volleyball. Allen High School participates in UIL Class 6A-1 as the second-largest school in the state (nearby Plano East is the largest).

The Eagle Stadium was built for $60 million, and was a part of a $120 million bond issue. It opened in 2012. In February 2014 cracks appeared, and the district closed the stadium for repairs. The stadium was reopened in June 2015 after completing in excess of $10 million worth of repairs.

See also

List of school districts in Texas
List of high schools in Texas

References

External links
 
 News about Allen ISD from The Dallas Morning News and other web sources

School districts in Collin County, Texas
Allen, Texas
Plano, Texas